The XXXI Army Corps was an short lived army corps of Germany's Wehrmacht during World War II. It was active from 27 March 1945 to 8 May 1945.

History 
The XXXI Army Corps was formed on 15 September 1942 in North-Western Germany in the area of the River Ems. 
It was therefore also known as Korps Ems.

The 2nd Naval Infantry Division, 7th Parachute Division and the 15th Panzergrenadier Division were part of the Corps. 
Its commander was General der Infanterie Siegfried Rasp.

Source

Army,31
Military units and formations established in 1945
1945 establishments in Germany
Military units and formations disestablished in 1945
1945 disestablishments in Germany